Pouy is a commune in Ou Chum District in north-east Cambodia. It contains Chan, Kan Saeung, Kreh, Ta Ngach, Svay, Khmaeng, Krala, Kang Kuy villages and has a population of 1,696.  In the 2007 commune council elections, all five seats went to members of the Cambodian People's Party. The land alienation rate in Pouy was low as of January 2006. (See Ratanakiri Province for background information on land alienation.)

Villages

References

Communes of Ratanakiri province